Deka Entoles (Greek: Δέκα Εντολές; English: Ten orders) is the third studio album by Greek singer Despina Vandi. It was released in Greece in 1997 by Minos EMI and was her first album to be certified, reaching  platinum status. This is the first album that Despina Vandi collaborated with popular composer Phoebus.

According to the Greek "Chart Show" and IFPI, the song "O Perittos" from the album is in the eighteenth position in the Top 30 with the most successful Greek pop songs of the 1990s.

Track listing

Music videos
"Ο Περιττός" (Σκηνοθεσία:
"Ουτοπία" (Σκηνοθεσία:
"Νυχτολούλουδο Μου" (Σκηνοθεσία: Βαγγέλης Καλαϊτζίδης)
"Το Άλλο Μισό" (Σκηνοθεσία:
"Δέκα Εντολές" (Σκηνοθεσία: Βαγγέλης Καλαϊτζίδης)
"Θέλω Να Σε Ξεχάσω" (Σκηνοθεσία:

Release history

Chart performance

Credits and personnel

Personnel
Vasilis Diamantis - clarinet
Pavlos Diamantopoulos - bass
Erinta - background vocals
Natalia Germanou - lyrics
Antonis Gounaris - guitars, acoustic guitars
Hakan - saz, oud
Giorgos Hatzopoulos - guitars
Giotis Kiourtsoglou - bass
Katerina Kiriakou - background vocals
Tony Kontaxakis - music, lyrics, orchestration, solo guitar, keyboards
Fedon Lianoudakis - accordion
Andreas Mouzakis - drums
Giannis Mpithikotsis - bouzouki, tzoura, baglama
Alex Panayi - background vocals
Alekos Paraskevopoulos - bass
Elias Paraskevopoulos - drums
Giannis Parios - lyrics
Giorgos Pavrianos - lyrics
Phoebus - music, lyrics, orchestration, programming, keyboards, background vocals
Giorgos Roilos - percussion
Despina Vandi - vocals
Thanasis Vasilopoulos - clarinet
Nikos Zervas - keyboards
Martha Zioga - background vocals

Production
Thodoris Hrisanthopoulos - digital mastering
Vaggelis Papadopoulos - sound, mix
Giorgos Stampolis - sound
Achilleas Theofilou - production manager
Manolis Vlahos - sound, mix

Design
Ntinos Diamantopoulos - photos
Evi Sourmaidou - styling
Krina Vronti - cover and insert design

Credits adapted from the album's liner notes.

References

Albums produced by Phoebus (songwriter)
Despina Vandi albums
Greek-language albums
1997 albums
Minos EMI albums